"The Distance Between Us" is a song by Norwegian new wave group Fra Lippo Lippi, released in 1986 as a 12" double A-side single with "Shouldn't Have to Be Like That", which reached No. 4 in Norway and No. 81 on the UK Singles Chart in early 1986. In the Philippines, "The Distance Between Us" was released there as an A-side with "Everytime I See You" as the B-side. Both songs became a huge success in that country, and appear on the band's third album, Songs. Due to their popularity in the Philippines, Sørensen has performed those songs plus many others on numerous occasions there.

References

1985 songs
1986 singles
Fra Lippo Lippi (band) songs
Virgin Records singles